Syrup USA were a four-piece indie pop band from Boston, Massachusetts, that formed in 1993 and disbanded in 1998. The brainchild of lead singer and guitarist Seana Carmody (formerly of Swirlies), their sound blended elements of 1960s pop and synthpop, and was compared to Stereolab.

Discography

Studio albums
All Over the Land (1997, Flydaddy Records)

Singles & EPs
Spinning at 45 Revolutions Per Minute (1995, Tru Luv)
"Teen Death" (1995, Tru Luv)

Members
 Seana Carmody - vocals, guitar
 Matt Fein - organ, guitar
 Orrin Anderson - drums 
 Sam Mallery - bass, vocals

References

American synth-pop groups
Indie rock musical groups from Massachusetts
Musical groups from Boston